Simon Hill (born 1967) is an Australian-based sports commentator.

Simon Hill may also refer to:

Simon Hill (musician) (born 1969), British musician, songwriter and record producer
Simon Hill (rugby union) (born 1968), Welsh international rugby player
Simon Hill (priest) (born 1964), Archdeacon of Taunton